The Type 360 is an air/surface search radar manufactured by Yangzhou Marine Electronic Instruments Research Institute (扬州船用电子仪器研究所)/ No. 723 Institute and is reportedly based on Selenia RAN-10S / SPS – 774. It is deployed on a number of new PLAN vessels, such as the Ma'anshan class frigate.

Specifications
 E/F-band
(Specs based on RAN-10S)
 Beam: 1.5° × 17° (coverage to 60° elevation)
 Peak Power: 140 kW
 Gain: 28 dB
 Burst width: 20.8 (compressed to 0.4) microseconds
 PRF: 900 pps
 Scan Rate: 15 or 30 rpm
 Max altitude: 10,000 m
Max detection range :- 250 km
 Mast weight: 900 kg
 Antenna dimensions: 4.3 m × 0.7 m
 Other features:
Phased coded burst pulse, each burst consist of 4 pulses and frequency agile transmitter
 Separate IFF antenna (4 × yagi) installed on top of antenna. 
 Other reported names:
 SR60
 H/LJQ360
 Seagull-S
 S-3

See also
 Type 054  Jiangkai class frigate
 Type 053  Jiangwei class frigate
 Type 052  Luhu class destroyer
 Type 051B Luhai class destroyer

External links
China Shipbuilding Industry Corporation 
Yangzhou Marine Electronic Instruments Research Institute 

Naval radars
Military radars of the People's Republic of China